Mary McCormic (November 11, 1889 – February 10, 1981) was an American operatic soprano and a professor of opera at the University of North Texas College of Music (1945–1960).

Career 
For more than a decade (early 1920s to late 1930s), McCormic was among the most famous sopranos in the world.  She was most known for her leading roles with the Paris National Opera, the Opéra-Comique (14 years), the Monte Carlo Opera, and the Chicago Civic Opera (10 years).  She spent much of 1937 touring with the Kryl Symphony Orchestra.

McCormic was born in Belleville, Arkansas.  A onetime obscure Arkansas housewife, McCormic rose to stardom and enjoyed a colorful personal life — four marriages and four divorces (men of no resemblance to one another), almost a fifth, a high-dollar lawsuit defense for assaulting an unauthorized female biographer, boom and bust personal wealth, witty humor, and brush with royalty.  McCormic captured world intrigue with the panache of the operas she starred in, all with the backdrop of being born at the end of the Gilded Age, growing up as a teenager during World War I, flourishing as an opera superstar through the Roaring Twenties, Prohibition, the Jazz Age, the Great Crash, and failing in her last two high-profile marriages in the throes of the Great Depression.  She died, age 91, in Amarillo, Texas.

Selected singing roles

Chicago Opera Association 

 1921–1922 Season — Operatic debut as Micaela in Carmen.  McCormic was a protégé of Mary Garden, who, rather than sing, debuted as General Director for what became the final year of Chicago Opera Association.
 February 1 and 8, 1922 — New York debut as Musetta in La Boheme at the Manhattan Opera House.

Chicago Civic Opera 
 1923 — Referred to as "the Cowgirl Soprano" by The New York Times, McCormic and Charles Marshall sang the leading roles in the premiere of The Snow Bird, an American one-act opera.

Paris Opera 
 July 24, 1926 — McCormic was  honored by receiving the title role for a special presentation of Romeo and Juliet with the Paris National Opera at the Paris Opera House in honor of Mulai Yusef, Sultan of Morocco.

Opera Comique 
 July 23, 1929 — Opera Comique debut, singing the title role in Manon.  She and William Martin, in July 1927, earned the distinction of being the only American natives singing in leading roles with Opéra-Comique.  McCormic was the first American woman in 60 years to sign a long-term contract with Opera Comique.

Artistic management 
 1924 — McCormic, early in her career, gained the artist management services of Charles L. Wagner (1869–1956), who also managed world figures that included Mary Garden, Amelita Galli-Curci, Walter Gieseking, Jussi Björling, Alexander Kipnis, and Jeanette MacDonald.
 1938 — McCormic, later in her career, was managed by Mme. LaReine.

Early life 
Born in Belleville, and reared in Dardanelle, and Ola – all three in Yell County, Arkansas – McCormic, was known growing up as Mamie Harris.  Mary McCormic was one of 4 born to:
 John H. Harris ( 1860 in Forsyth, Georgia – 9 November 1946) and wife,
 Mary Jimmie Harris (née Williard;  1865 in Tennessee – 31 December 1929 in Amarillo, Texas)
 Odelle Crawford Harris (4 July 1886 in Belleville, Arkansas – 26 May 1950 in Amarillo, Texas)
 Thurman Harris (died young)
 Mamie Harris (11 November 1889 in Belleville, Arkansas – 10 February 1981 in Amarillo, Texas)
 Williard Harris (10 February 1892 in Yell County, Arkansas – 24 March 1949 in Amarillo, Texas)
 Norborn Harris ( 1898 – 10 February 1944 in San Francisco)<ref name="AmarilloTimes 1944 Feb 14">"Norbort Harris Dies in Railway Accident," Amarillo Globe-Times," February 14, 1944, pg. 3., col 2</ref>
 Johnnie Harris (a girl, died young)
  
Mamie's interest in becoming an opera star began at age nine, and continued while attending Ola High School of Ola, Arkansas.  She, with her family, moved to Portales, New Mexico, in 1907, then to Amarillo, Texas in 1909.

Emil Frey Myers (1886–1957) gave McCormic's her first voice lessons in Amarillo.  He was the conductor the Amarillo Civic Chorus and was a major concert promoter in the Texas Panhandle.  Myers, with his wife, Lila, founded the Amarillo School of Music, Inc.

McCormic's father and two brothers, Odell and Williard, built a grocery store business — "J H Harris & Sons" and "Harris Food Stores" and "Rolling Stone Stores" (as many as 10 stores located in Borger, Pampa, Dalhart and Amarillo). The business was sold in 1946, shortly before the death of the father. The father purchased the first portion of the ranch in 1915.

During a 1914 Tri-State Fair Music Festival in Amarillo, McCormic became aware of the operatic possibilities of her voice.  By way of a Methodist Choir in Chicago and a singing contest sponsored by Mary Garden, her operatic potential became known to others.

 College 

McCormic studied music at Ouachita College, University of Arkansas and then, with the intention of becoming a lyric soprano, Northwestern University where she took vocal lessons.  McCormic became a protégé of Mary Garden (1874–1967).  Both McCormic and Garden had been vocal students of the renowned voice teacher Mrs. Sarah Robinson-Duff (née Robinson; 1858–1934)

 Marriages 

 Quotes on men and marriage 

 Filmography 
 1933: Paddy the Next Best Thing Teaching 
In 1944, Wilfred Bain, dean of the University of North Texas College of Music, recruited Mary McCormic to create and direct an Opera Workshop. McCormic transformed herself from diva to artist-in-residence educator. She founded, defined, directed, and, when necessary, defended the school's first Opera Workshop. She built the Opera Workshop from scratch – on a shoestring budget – molding it over 16 prolific years into what has become her crowning legacy that, for  years, has enriched the Southwest.  Wilfred Bain went down in history as one of the greatest music school deans of all time.  In books and memoirs of accomplishments, Bain often tells of the hiring of Mary McCormic as one of this great accomplishments at North Texas.

The North Texas Opera Workshop was the first collegiate touring opera workshops west of the Mississippi and, at the time of its founding, was the only opera production company in existence in the Southwest. The San Antonio Grand Opera, Houston Grand Opera, Dallas Opera, Opera in the Heights and others were not yet in existence.

Through the opera workshop, McCormic pioneered an approach to opera in an era that wiped out major opera companies on the heels of the Great Depression.  The new "low-cost workshop" model also offered new opportunities for composers who otherwise would never have their operas produced. And the workshop model gave hope for opera itself, when many in the world dismissed opera as a bygone luxury of the rich. The new "low cost model" also gave access in regions of the world that otherwise had little hope of having opera.

Under McCormic, the opera workshop performed locally, toured, and did broadcasts in radio and TV often with near quality of a reputable professional company.

When the Dallas Opera was founded in 1957, the UNT Opera Workshop and Vocal Studies provided a steady supply of singers for the Dallas Opera Chorus.

In 1966, McCormic retired and moved to Amarillo to make her home with her widowed sister-in-law, Mrs. Odell Harris.

The UNT Opera Workshop is an integral part of one of the most comprehensive music schools in the world; a school that, since the 1940s, has been among the largest in the country, and in recent years, holds the largest enrollment of any music institution accredited by the National Association of Schools of Music.

 UNT Opera Workshop Productions 

 Directed by Mary McCormic 

 The Bohemian Girl (1944)
 The Chocolate Soldier (Spring 1945)
 The Bohemian Girl (Summer 1945)
 The Stranger of Manzano (premier, May 1946)
 The Bohemian Girl (1946)
 Rigoletto (March 1948)
 Abduction from the Seraglio (May 1949)
 Daughter of the Regiment (Jan 1950) †
 Romeo and Juliet (1950)
 Otello (Nov 1951)
 La Boheme (Dec 1952)
 Faust (Dec 1953)
 HMS Pinafore (July 1954)
 Abduction from the Seraglio (May 1954)
 Die Fledermaus (April 1955)
 La Boheme (1955)
 Down in the Valley (1955)
 Trial by Jury (1955)
 The Saint of Bleecker Street (Summer 1955, 2nd Act)
 Boris Godunov (Summer 1955, last Act)
 Don Pasquale (Summer 1955, duets)
 Madama Butterfly (Summer 1955, duets)
 Pagliacci (1956)
 The Princess and the Pea (May 1956)
 La Serva Padrona (May 1956)
 La Boheme (Summer 1956)
 Down in the Valley (Summer 1956)
 Rigoletto (1957)
 Trouble in Tahiti (1957)
 Amelia Goes to the Ball (1957)
 The Impresario (1957)
 The Emperor's New Clothes (1957)
 The Marriage of Figaro (two casts, 1958)
 Faust (a scene, 1958)
 Comedy on the Bridge (1958)
 The Barber of Seville (excerpts, 1958)
 La Traviata (last act, 1958)
 Comedy on the Bridge (1959)
 Cavalleria Rusticana (1959)
 Tosca (1960)

 Dec 1958 — McCormic directed the first televised opera in the Southwest on WBAP-TV Fort Worth in a student production of Carmen † Mary Garden supervised the final ten-days of rehearsals

 Composition dedicated to McCormic 
 Blanche Robinson (Mrs. Martin Hennion Robinson) (née Williams born May 18, 1883 near Liberty, Kansas; died August 1969 Los Angeles) composed "Love Was a Beggar" for Mary McCormic.

 References 

External links

 Mary is buried at Llano Cemetery, Amarillo in section D, lot 6 space 1 (February 12, 1981).  By her is:
Pat Harris, Section D lot 6 space 1A (February 22, 1993)
Mary Elizabeth Harris, Section D lot 6 space 2 (February 6, 1990)
Willard Harris, Section D lot 6 space 2 (March 26, 1949)
 McCormic's Grave Marker and Llano Cemetery in Amarillo
 Biography of Mary McCormic (in German), Operissimo concertissimo'', Milan, Zurich

American operatic sopranos
1889 births
1981 deaths
Chicago Civic Opera
Texas classical music
University of North Texas College of Music faculty
University of Arkansas alumni
Northwestern University alumni
People from Yell County, Arkansas
20th-century American women opera singers
Women music educators